Sékou Junior Sanogo (born 5 May 1989) is an Ivorian professional footballer who plays as a midfielder for French  club Paris FC on loan from the Serbian club Red Star Belgrade.

Club career

Sanogo was part of the Young Boys squad that won the 2017–18 Swiss Super League, their first league title in 32 years.

On 21 January 2020, Sanogo signed a one-year loan with Serbian club Red Star Belgrade.

Sanogo completed his move to the Serbian heavy weights Red Star Belgrade FC on 27 January 2021 from Saudi club Al-Ittihad Club (Jeddah) on a two-year deal with his contract expiring in 2023.

On 31 January 2023, Sanogo joined Paris FC in the French Ligue 2 on loan until the end of the season.

International career
An Ivory Coast international, Sanogo made his international debut for the ”Les Éléphants” in a friendly match which resulted in a 1–1 tie with Senegal on 27 March 2017.

Honours
Africa Sports
Ligue 1: 2008
Coupe de Côte d'Ivoire (2): 2009, 2010

Young Boys
Swiss Super League (2): 2017–18, 2018–19

Red Star Belgrade
Serbian SuperLiga (3): 2019–20, 2020–21, 2021–22
Serbian Cup (2): 2020–21, 2021–22
Individual
Swiss Super League Team of the Year: 2016–17, 2017–18

References

External links
 

1989 births
Living people
Ivorian footballers
Association football midfielders
Ivory Coast international footballers
Africa Sports d'Abidjan players
FC Thun players
FC Lausanne-Sport players
BSC Young Boys players
Ittihad FC players
Red Star Belgrade footballers
Paris FC players
Swiss Super League players
Saudi Professional League players
Serbian SuperLiga players
Ligue 2 players
Ivorian expatriate footballers
Ivorian expatriate sportspeople in Switzerland
Ivorian expatriate sportspeople in Saudi Arabia
Ivorian expatriate sportspeople in Serbia
Ivorian expatriate sportspeople in France
Expatriate footballers in Switzerland
Expatriate footballers in Saudi Arabia
Expatriate footballers in Serbia
Expatriate footballers in France